Hugues Moret (born 21 April 1997) is a French male canoeist who won two medals at senior level at the Wildwater Canoeing World Championships.

Medals at the World Championships
Senior

References

External links
 

1997 births
Living people
French male canoeists
Place of birth missing (living people)